Wales played their first international association football match on 25 March 1876 against Scotland. As of September 2021, fifteen Welsh international players have scored a hat-trick (three goals) or more in a game. The first player to achieve the feat was John Price who scored four goals against Ireland on 25 February 1882. Other than Price, three other players have scored four goals during a match, Jack Doughty against Ireland in 1888, Mel Charles against Northern Ireland in 1962 and Ian Edwards against Malta in 1978.

Wales' first five hat-tricks were all scored against the same opposition, Ireland, before Trevor Ford scored three times against Belgium on 23 November 1949, also becoming the first Welsh player to score a hat-trick against a team not from the home nations. As of September 2021 the most recent player to score a hat-trick for Wales was Gareth Bale, in a 2022 FIFA World Cup qualification match against Belarus on 5 September 2021.

Wales have conceded 26 hat-tricks during their history, the first being scored by Clement Mitchell in a friendly match on 3 February 1883 against England. The first player to score a hat-trick against Wales from outside the home nations was Rajko Mitić for Yugoslavia on 21 May 1953. Seven players have scored more than three goals in a single match against Wales, Joe Bambrick's six goals for Ireland during a 1929–30 British Home Championship match is the most goals scored by a player against Wales in a single match. Filippo Inzaghi of Italy is the most recent player to score a hat-trick against Wales, in a UEFA Euro 2004 qualifying match on 6 September 2003.

Hat-tricks for Wales
Key

Table
Wartime internationals, not regarded as official matches, are not included in the list.
The result is presented with Wales' score first.

Hat-tricks conceded by Wales
Wartime internationals, not regarded as official matches, are not included in the list. The result is presented with Wales' score first.

Notes

 Some sources attribute a hat-trick to Alex Smith during a 5–1 victory for Scotland on 15 March 1902. However, others, including the Scottish Football Association, attribute two of his goals to other Scottish players.

References

Hat-trick
Wales
Association football player non-biographical articles